Ethan Cameron O'Neil Nelson-Roberts is an English professional footballer who plays for Isthmian League side Cheshunt in Central Midfield.

Playing career 
Nelson-Roberts joined AFC Wimbledon's youth set-up aged 12. In 2017/18 season he became Captain of AFC Wimbledon Under 18 Academy team. On 5 December, he made his professional debut as a substitute in a 2–0 EFL Trophy defeat at Yeovil Town.

Statistics

References 

Living people
English footballers
Association football wingers
AFC Wimbledon players
Black British sportsmen
2000 births